James Henry Spring Branson (11 June 1842 – 8 April 1897) was an officer of the Indian volunteer force and a lawyer, who was the acting Advocate General of the Madras Presidency.

Career
Spring Branson was commissioned into the Indian volunteer force and served with the Madras Artillery Volunteers. As Commandant, his decision to allow "native gentlemen" to serve with the regiment almost caused a revolt amongst the white soldiers. The Madras Government hastily rescinded Spring Branson's order and continued to enforce the ban on "native" volunteers. He resigned from the army as a lieutenant-colonel a few years later in order to practice as a lawyer.

He was appointed first, Crown Prosecutor and then, Public-Prosecutor, Madras, 4 July 1885. In March 1887, he was appointed acting Advocate-General of Madras Presidency. Spring Branson served as a legislator in the Madras Legislative Council between 1886 and his death. He served as President of the Madras Bar Association.

He died in 1897 and is buried in the Anglican St. Mary's Church, Chennai. Branson Gardens in Chennai are named after him.

References
 

1897 deaths
1842 births
Advocates General for Tamil Nadu
James
Members of the Madras Legislative Council
British people in colonial India
British lawyers
Indian Defence Force officers